Round Loaf is a late-Neolithic or Bronze Age tumulus on Anglezarke Moor in the West Pennine Moors near Chorley in Lancashire, England. The bowl barrow is a scheduled monument considered to be of national importance. It was first scheduled in March 1954. The structure is aligned between Great Hill and Pikestones.

Background
Round Loaf is one of 10,000 bowl barrows constructed between the late-Neolithic period and the late-Bronze Age (2400 - 1500 BC). They are funerary monuments in the form of earth or rubble mounds covering single or multiple burials. Some were surrounded by a ditch. Some are in isolated locations as is Round Loaf and some are grouped in cemeteries. They vary in size and regional variations show a range of different burial practices.

Description
Round Loaf occupies a prominent landmark position on Anglezarke Moor. Some erosion has occurred on its summit. It  has not been excavated and its archaeology is possibly undisturbed. The ancient monument includes an oval mound measuring 73 metres from north to south and 66 metres from east to west. It is constructed of earth and small stones to a height of from 3.6 to 5.5 metres. Flakes of flint have been found on the mound's summit.

See also
Scheduled monuments in Lancashire

Notes and references

External links

 Round Loaf on Google Maps
 Photographs of Round Loaf at Megalithic Portal

Populated places established in the 2nd millennium BC
Scheduled monuments in Lancashire
Geography of Chorley
Stone Age sites in England
West Pennine Moors
Neolithic settlements
Archaeological sites in Lancashire
Barrows in the United Kingdom
Bronze Age sites in Lancashire